Afri Food Network popularly known as African Food Network is a website that is dedicated to African food and lifestyle. The site was launched in January 2017 by Kevin Eze in Abuja, Nigeria.

History
African Food Network started off as just a mere website with less than 50 recipes in 2017 and now one of the biggest online African food recipe directory with over 500 recipes sourced from different authors. African Food Network was created to redefine the world’s view about African Cuisine, Chefs and Traditional Cooks” cited by the founder.

Events Hosted

See also
 List of websites about food and drink

References 

Nigerian cuisine